Per Christian Ellefsen (born 14 February 1954) is a Norwegian actor, mostly known from his roles in Elling and Rare Exports: A Christmas Tale.

He became a star in Norway because of his title role of Elling (2001) after more than 20 years as a leading stage actor.

Filmography

References

External links

Living people
1954 births